Aechmea blumenavii is a plant species in the genus Aechmea. This species is endemic to the state of Santa Catarina, in Brazil.

It is endangered and classified as rare by the IUCN.

Two varieties have been named, although var. alba has only been collected once:
 Aechmea blumenavii var. blumenavii
 Aechmea blumenavii var. alba

References

IUCN Red List 1997

blumenavii
Endemic flora of Brazil
Flora of the Atlantic Forest
Flora of Santa Catarina (state)
Critically endangered flora of South America
Garden plants of South America